Kondaveeti Simham is a 1981 Indian Telugu-language action film, produced by M. Arjuna Raju and K. Sivarama Raju under the Roja Movies banner and directed by K. Raghavendra Rao. The film stars N. T. Rama Rao, Sridevi, Jayanthi, Mohan Babu  and music Chakravarthy. The core story of the film was based on the 1974 Tamil film Thanga Pathakkam and was remade by same producer - director duo in Hindi as Farz Aur Kanoon (1982). The film was an all-time blockbuster at box office becoming the highest-grossing film of the year beating ANR'S Premabhisekham with a terrific margin and the highest grossing Telugu film at the time of its release crossing the lifetime collections of ANR's Premabhishekam and NTR's own Adavi Ramudu.

Plot 
The film begins with Inspector Ranjith Kumar a sheer cop who swears to protect the integrity and sovereignty of the nation. Once he intrepidly captures a brigand gang in which he is wounded. At the same time, his wife Annapurna delivers a baby boy. Since Annapurna's father is a strong believer in astrology, he learns that the child ignites the father's death. So, he ostracizes him with a maidservant Gauri and falsifies him as dead. After some time, Ranjith is honored with the Gold Medal nobilitating as Kondaveeti Simham and the couple is blessed with another kid Ravi. But in vain, Ravi turns into a spoiled brat in boyhood itself. So, for his welfare, Ranjith sends him to a juvenile home and maintains secrecy from Annapurna. Thereafter, Ranjith sentences a malicious hoodlum Nagaraju who pledges to destroy Ranjith's clan.

Years roll by, and presently, Ranjith is ennobled as SP. Ramu the elder son of Ranjith grows up in a village. Once he is acquainted with a charming girl Devi daughter of Major Gopalam the soul mate of Ranjith. Initially, they squabble then fall in love. Just after, Ramu aims to clear their debt and arrives at the city where with the help of Gopalam he starts up a business. Timeless, Ravi also backs with hostility toward his father and couple up with a girl Padma. Simultaneously, Nagaraju releases, ploys to kill Annapurna and she is rescued by Ramu when he gets closer to them. Later on, Ravi makes a huge robbery at Gopalam's residence and indicts Ramu. However, Ranjith gazes at and seizes Ravi. Exploiting it, Nagaraju intrigues by hanging Ravi after release as avenging on Ranjith. Ravi quits the house and acts according to Nagaraju, making his parents dispirited as a payback.

Grief-stricken Annapurna paralyzes and becomes terminally ill when Gauri reveals the birth secret of Ramu. Before dying, she takes a word from him to reform his brother. Here, Ravi avoids her funeral too which Ramu performs. Besides, Ranjith is appointed on special duty to safeguard a plan containing national secrets for which Nagaraju conspires to eliminate him. Gazing it, Ramu gamely enrolls with Nagaraju and makes Ravi figure out the fiendishness of the blackguards. But unfortunately, they are caught. Right now, Ranjith learns the actuality and flares up on Nagaraju. At last, Ranjith ceases the baddies but sacrifices his life while securing the plan. Finally, the movie is dedicated to the bravery of the cops of the nation.

Cast

N. T. Rama Rao as S. P. Ranjith Kumar & Ramu (Dual Role)
Sridevi as Devi
Jayanthi as Annapurna
Mohan Babu as Ravi
Rao Gopal Rao as Major Gopalam
Satyanarayana as Nagaraju
Kanta Rao as I. G.
Allu Rama Lingaiah as China Yuddham
Nagesh as Sitapati
Mukkamala as Ranjith's father-in-law
Chalapathi Rao as Veerabhadraiah
Thyagaraju as a dacoit  
Jagga Rao as a dacoit
P. J. Sarma as Police Inspector
Chidatala Appa Rao as Gopalam's servant
Telephone Satyanarayana as Army Chief 
Geetha as Padma
Subhashini as Pushpa
Pushpalatha as Tulasamma
Jhansi
Sri Lakshmi
Girija
Neelaveni
Master Harish as young Ravi

Soundtrack

Music was composed by Chakravarthy. Lyrics were written by Veturi. Music released by SAREGAMA Audio Company.

References

External links

 

1981 films
1980s Telugu-language films
Films directed by K. Raghavendra Rao
Films scored by K. Chakravarthy
Indian action films
Fictional portrayals of the Andhra Pradesh Police
Telugu remakes of Tamil films
1981 action films